Alessandro della Via was an Italian engraver. He resided at Venice c. 1730. He engraved several portraits and a plate, representing the Virgin and Infant Christ, with St. Sebastian and other Saints after Paolo Veronese.

References

18th-century Italian painters
Italian male painters
Painters from Venice
Italian engravers
Year of death unknown
Year of birth unknown
18th-century Italian male artists